Grinner's Food Systems, Limited is a Canadian company that franchises two restaurant chains, Greco Pizza and Captain Submarine in Eastern Canada. It is based in Truro, Nova Scotia. The company is owned by Trucorp Investments Incorporated of Dieppe, New Brunswick.

Trucorp also owns Bonte Foods Limited, Frank and Gino's Restaurant, and Chris Brothers food products. William Hay is chairman of Trucorp, a food and beverage company that ranked 77th on a list of the 101 top companies in Atlantic Canada in 2004. The Grinner's division had revenue of $30.4 million in 2008.

Major franchises

Greco Pizza and Captain Submarine 

Both Greco Pizza and Captain Submarine are quick-service restaurant chains. Many of the over-170 Greco Pizza locations in Quebec, Ontario, New Brunswick, Nova Scotia, and Newfoundland operate co-branded with Captain Submarine.

Established in Moncton, New Brunswick in 1977, Greco Pizza is one of Atlantic Canada's largest pizza chains. Menu items include pizza, donair, salads, garlic fingers, and the restaurant's proprietary dipping sauces.

Captain Submarine was acquired by Grinner's in 2002, when it only had 9 locations (21 fewer than it had in the 1980s). The purchase brought the number of Grinners franchised restaurants from 111 to 120.

Frank and Gino's
Frank and Gino's is a restaurant in Truro, Nova Scotia, Canada that is owned by Grinner's. Its menu includes pizza, pasta, seafood and beef entrees.

See also
List of Canadian restaurant chains

References

External links
Frank and Gino's Website

Restaurant franchises
Restaurant chains in Canada
Food and drink companies based in Nova Scotia
Restaurants in Nova Scotia